David Alexander Thomson, (26 February 1856 – 30 October 1926), was an Australian politician.

Thomson was a member of the Australian House of Representatives, representing the Division of Capricornia, Queensland, between 16 December 1903 until 12 December 1906. He was a member of the Australian Labor Party.

References

1856 births
1926 deaths
Australian Labor Party members of the Parliament of Australia
Members of the Australian House of Representatives
Members of the Australian House of Representatives for Capricornia
20th-century Australian politicians